Abrotanella trilobata is a member of the daisy family and is found in southern Argentina and southern Chile.

References

Flora of Argentina
Flora of Chile
trilobata